Samantha Sky Shelton  (born November 15, 1978) is an American actress and singer.

Early life
Samantha Shelton was born in Los Angeles, California, to director Christopher and Carol Stromme. She has three older sisters: Koren, Erin, and fellow actress Marley Shelton. Shelton studied acting while attending the North Carolina School of the Arts, and at the Los Angeles High School of the Arts.

Career

Acting career
Her debut was as a waitress in the film Hairshirt, before several television guest roles, including a recurring role on Judging Amy. She had a supporting role in White Oleander as a pregnant girl in foster care. In 2003, she starred alongside her sister Marley in the independent film Moving Alan and she played the best friend roles in Learning Curves and Shopgirl. She also played a receptionist in the independent hit Ellie Parker. Some of her scenes were cut, but can be found in the 'special features' section of the DVD.

In early 2006, Shelton completed filming for the independent film Marcus, which is currently being distributed at film festivals and trying to secure a cinematic release.

In 2006, she starred in Monarch Cove, a TV series shown on Lifetime Network.

Music career
From 2001 to 2005, Shelton performed in the jazz cabaret act If All the Stars Were Pretty Babies with fellow actress Zooey Deschanel.
Shelton has released three EPs: Are You Kidding Around?, Cranky Moon and Sea Legs.

Personal life
She is the sister of actress Marley Shelton. She is married to writer Steven Davis and has a son, Lazlo and a daughter, Poppy.

Filmography

Film

Television

References

External links

American film actresses
American television actresses
Actresses from Los Angeles
1978 births
Living people
University of North Carolina School of the Arts alumni
21st-century American women